Juan Manuel García (born 24 February 1951) is a Mexican water polo player. He competed at the 1968 Summer Olympics, the 1972 Summer Olympics and the 1976 Summer Olympics.

References

1951 births
Living people
Mexican male water polo players
Olympic water polo players of Mexico
Water polo players at the 1968 Summer Olympics
Water polo players at the 1972 Summer Olympics
Water polo players at the 1976 Summer Olympics
Sportspeople from Mexico City
20th-century Mexican people